The Syracuse Telegram and Courier was a daily newspaper serving Syracuse, New York. The paper was founded in 1856 and published under a series of different names until it stopped publishing in 1905 due to high levels of debt.

Logos 1865 

The Syracuse Daily Courier and Union logo, published on June 12, 1865:

The logo published on January 13, 1867 was titled Syracuse Courier and Union:

Logos 1889–1897 

The logo published on March 9, 1889 was titled The Syracuse Courier:

Logos 1898–1905 

The first logo published on January 1, 1898 was titled The Evening Telegram and Courier:

On May 16, 1905, the newspaper was simply known as Syracuse Telegram":

By May 30, 1905, as a result of new ownership, the newspaper sported the Syracuse Telegram logo:

References

External links
American journalism: a history of newspapers in the United States, by Frank Luther Mott, Routledge, 2000

Defunct newspapers published in Syracuse, New York
Publications established in 1856
Publications disestablished in 1905
Daily newspapers published in New York (state)